Om Prakash Mathur (born 2 January 1952) is a member of Rajya Sabha from Rajasthan state in India and is a senior politician from Bharatiya Janata Party. Initially, he was groomed by Bhairon Singh Shekhawat but later he became a leader on his own in BJP. He was a Pracharak with the RSS and later General Secretary- in charge of the Gujarat BJP.

On 29 May 2016, he was nominated as one of the BJP candidates for the biennial elections of the Rajya Sabha slated to be held on 11 June. He will contest from Rajasthan.
 
He is from the village Bedal, near Falna in Bali tehsil of Pali district in Rajasthan. Born in 1952, he studied B.A. at Rajasthan University, Jaipur.

References 

Rajasthani politicians
People from Pali district
1952 births
University of Rajasthan alumni
Living people
Rajya Sabha members from Rajasthan
Rajasthani people
Bharatiya Janata Party politicians from Rajasthan
Recipients of the Padma Shri in science & engineering